Irfan Arif Shahîd  (Nazareth, Mandatory Palestine, January 15, 1926 – Washington, D.C., November 9, 2016), born as Erfan Arif Qa'war, was a scholar in the field of Oriental studies. He was from 1982 until his death professor emeritus at Georgetown University,  where he had been the Oman Professor of Arabic and Islamic Literature. Shahîd was also a Fellow of the Medieval Academy of America since 2012.

Biography
Erfan Arif was born in Nazareth, Mandatory Palestine to a Palestinian Christian family. He left in 1946 to attend St John's College, Oxford, where he read classics and Greco-Roman history. He studied under renowned antiquities historian A. N. Sherwin-White.

He received his Ph.D. from Princeton University in Arabic and Islamic Studies. His doctorate thesis was “Early Islam and Poetry.” Shahîd'Erfan's research was primarily focused on three major areas: the area where the Greco-Roman world, especially the Byzantine Empire, meets the Arabic and Islamic worlds in the late antique and medieval times, Islamic studies, particularly the Quran and Arabic literature, especially classical and medieval Arabic poetry. In 2012 Irfan Shahîd became a Fellow of the Medieval Academy of America.

Selected works
 Rome and the Arabs: A Prolegomenon to the Study of Byzantium and the Arabs, 1984

  Byzantium and the Arabs in The Fourth Century, 1984
	
  Byzantium and the Arabs in the Fifth Century, 1989
	
 Byzantium and the Arabs in the Sixth Century, Volume 1, part 1, 1995 	
   Byzantium and the Arabs in the Sixth Century, Volume 1, part 2, 1995 	

 Byzantium and the Arabs in the Sixth Century, Volume 2, Part 1, 2002 
Byzantium and the Arabs in the Sixth Century, Volume 2, Part 2, 2010

Byzantium and the Semitic Orient Before the Rise of Islam (Collected Studies Series: No.Cs270), 1988

Omar Khayyám, the Philosopher-Poet of Medieval Islam, 1982

References

External links
 As enacted, S. 1483 is Private Law 536, 84th Congress (70 Stat. A18). "59 - Statement by the President Upon Signing Bill for the Relief of Irfan Kawar." , The American Presidency Project, Washington DC, 19 March 1956. Retrieved on 22 August 2015.

1926 births
2016 deaths
People from Nazareth
Christian scholars of Islam
Palestinian Christians
Palestinian Byzantinists
Alumni of St John's College, Oxford
Princeton University alumni
Georgetown University faculty
Fellows of the Medieval Academy of America
Scholars of Byzantine history